This is a list of the 10 members of the European Parliament for Ireland appointed to the delegation from the Oireachtas after the 1977 general election who served from December 1977 until the first direct elections in 1979.

See also
Members of the European Parliament 1958–1979 – List by country

External links
ElectionsIreland.org – 1977 Delegation
European Parliament office in Ireland – Irish MEPs: 1973–79

1977-79
European Parliament
List
Ireland